Concordia is a town and municipality of the Magdalena Department in northern Colombia. Founded by Mandate 007 of June 24, 1999 with portion of territories from the municipalities of Cerro San Antonio and Pedraza.

References

External links
 Gobernacion del Magdalena - Concordia

Municipalities of Magdalena Department